Steven Matthews is an Irish Green Party politician who has been a Teachta Dála (TD) for the Wicklow constituency since the 2020 general election. He was appointed Chair of the Committee on Housing, Local Government and Heritage in September 2020.

Personal and early life
Matthews is a trained Engineer, holding a degree from Dublin Institute of Technology in Planning and Environmental Management. He lives in Bray, County Wicklow, with his wife Erika Doyle and their two children. Doyle replaced her husband on Wicklow County Council in February 2020. Doyle was hired as Matthews' secretarial assistant in the Oireachtas in June 2020.

Political career
Before being elected as a TD, he was a Bray Town Councillor, where he served from 2008 to 2014, before becoming a member of Wicklow County Council following the 2014 local elections. He served as chairperson of the Bray Municipal District of the council in 2016 and 2019. He held that office until he was elected as a Green Party TD for Wicklow following the 2020 general election.

References

External links
Green Party profile

Year of birth missing (living people)
Living people
Members of the 33rd Dáil
Green Party (Ireland) TDs
Alumni of Dublin Institute of Technology